The 2014–15 season of the Norwegian Premier League, the highest bandy league for men in Norway.

Twenty-one games were played, with 2 points given for wins and 1 for draws. Stabæk won the league, whereas no teams were regulated and the league was expanded with two teams from the following season.

League table

References

Seasons in Norwegian bandy
2015 in bandy
2014 in bandy
Band
Band